Rosenbergia drouini is a species of beetle in the family Cerambycidae. It was described by Rigout in 1992. It is known from Australia.

References

Batocerini
Beetles described in 1992